The Battle of Sehested was fought between Danish and Russian-Prussian-British troops at Sehested (in Holstein) on 10 December 1813 during the War of the Sixth Coalition.
The Danish Auxiliary Corps, which fought on the side of the French defeated the coalition forces commanded by Major General Ludwig von Wallmoden-Gimborn. 

The battle, however, would not ultimately change the course of the war, which ended in 1814 with Denmark’s defeat.

Background
The kingdom of Denmark-Norway found itself involved in the Napoleonic Wars following the events of the Battle of Copenhagen in 1807. To prevent the large Danish-Norwegian fleet from falling into the hands of Napoleon's French Empire, the United Kingdom attacked Copenhagen destroying ships at anchor. The Danish-Norwegians though had no intention of joining Napoleon. Moreover the decision to seize the Danish-Norwegian navy, before they fell into french hands, was done on the basis of a fallacious report send by a british army officer operating as a spy in Copenhagen. The report testified that the danish-norwegian navy was indeed mobilising, when in reality it was merely under maintenance. The army officer was unable to correctly identify the danish-norwegian navy's intention, due to his inexperience with maritime logistics.
The kingdom, which until then had tried to maintain a precarious neutrality in the conflict between the French and the British, thereafter sided openly with France. While keeping faith with this alliance, the prudent King Frederick VI of Denmark tried to keep the country out of the frequent campaigns as much as possible, and the Danish troops did not go beyond a generic employment as occupation troops in the northern regions of Germany.

Following the French defeat in the Russian Campaign, at the beginning of 1813, Denmark-Norway formally declared a state of neutrality. The country was bankrupt and more than ever needed a return to peace to restore its disastrous economy. The negotiations initiated by Frederick IV with the powers of the sixth anti-French coalition, however, were unsuccessful. The coalitions favored Sweden's claims for an annexation of Norway, and in March 1813, the king decided to renew his treaty of alliance with France; a Danish-Norwegian expeditionary force, 13,000 strong under the orders of Prince Frederik of Hesse (brother-in-law of the monarch) was then deployed in the Schleswig-Holstein region and supported the forces of Marshal Louis Nicolas Davout in his campaigns in the Hamburg area against the multinational troops of the Russian general Ludwig von Wallmoden-Gimborn.

Shortly after Napoleon’s defeat at Leipzig on 19 October 1813, Davout received orders to defend against the advancing coalition armies. Davout successfully prepared the defense of Hamburg and made the decision to establish a defensive line behind the Stecknitz River. French infantry divisions were placed to defend the southern portion of the line while the Danish Auxiliary corps under the command of Prince Frederik was ordered to defend the northern part of the line, from Travemünde to an area north of Mölln.   

Wallmoden commanded the coalition army given the responsibility to commence offensive operations against the French. The coalition plan called for the French divisions to be surrounded and besieged in Hamburg. Once the French had been surrounded in Hamburg the offensive would advance north to isolate and destroy the Danish Auxiliary corps opening Denmark for invasion. The defeat or surrender of the Danes would then allow Sweden to take possession of Norway. As a part of this plan, Wallmoden's army was reinforced with a Swedish corps and placed under the overall command of Prince Karl Johan of Sweden.

In late November, Davout realized that a major enemy offensive was forthcoming. He instantly began drawing up plans for the French withdrawal to Hamburg. This left the defence of Holstein in the hands of the Danish Auxiliary corps. On 30 November, Davout withdrew his French divisions to Hamburg. On 9 December, coalition forces crossed the Alster River, severed the passage way between Hamburg and Holstein, and isolated the Danes. A short time later, Prince Frederik learned that the French corps was surrounded in Hamburg.

With no means to reach Hamburg, the Danes left their defensive position in Lübeck and withdrew north toward Bornhöved. At the same time, coalition forces under the command of Wallmoden moved north in an attempt to block the Danish line of retreat. The Danes crossed the Eider Canal and took positions near Gettorf and Lindau. Elements of Wallmoden's corps by that time had reached Sehested. The Danes knew that Wallmoden was on their heels and had two alternatives. If they continued to march north, they feared that their slow convoy would be attacked by a Swedish cavalry division now located in Wittensee. If they marched west in an attempt to reach a defensive position at Rendsborg, they would likely cross paths and be forced to confront Wallmoden’s infantry. On 10 December, Prince Frederik made his decision and issued orders to march west toward Sehested.

The Battle

Holtsee and Haby
As the head of the Danish force was reaching the town of Holtsee, an enemy force could be seen in occupation. French General Lallemand's Advanced Guard deployed into battle formation, and the Danish vanguard halted to allow them to clear the enemy from the village. Major Baumberg commanding the Allied forces holding Holtsee spotted the Danes, but had no intention of engaging an entire corps with only three battalions. As such, he slowly began to withdraw west to the town of Haby, facing southeast.

When the main Danish force arrived, Prince Frederik dispatched two squadrons of the Holstein Cavalry Regiment and the Polish Cavalry Regiment to observe Baumberg's movements east of Haby. At the same time, he also sent two battalions of the Holstein Regiment, the battalion of the Queen's Regiment, and a hussar squadron to cover the area to the northeast of Holtsee.

Baumberg's slow withdrawal had given time for Wallmoden to bring up the rest of his troops from Sehested. However as the Danish marching continued, he allowed himself to be pushed back towards the village. When the Danes passed the southern end of the causeway leading through Haby, a detachment under Major Berger was left to prevent Baumberg from descending on the rear of the convoy. This was just in time as, within a few minutes, Baumberg's force attempted to storm the vanguard. This task was virtually impossible, as they could only form up in a column eight men wide, and the attack was beaten off with such heavy casualties, that Baumberg was effectively cut out of the action. The units left to track him east of Haby, were now joined by the four squadrons of cavalry from Holtsee, and as a consequence of this disastrous attack, these units were now free to begin to march towards the Sehested road and the rear of the vanguard.

Danish attack on Sehested
Wallmoden then pulled back to Sehested, where he turned to face the Danes, forming up at the north of the long, straggling town, just south of the point where the Rendsborg road took a sharp right turn, with his left just north of the marsh which ran along the western side of the town on the river Eider. The Mecklenburg Jaeger battalion was sent across the river in the direction of Holtsee, to see if they could harass the Danish vanguard with long range musketry. Seeing their enemy taking up this position, the Danes once again halted, and prepared for battle. The 1st and 4th battalions of the Oldenburg regiments formed into columns, and supported by the fire of Gonner's and Koye's batteries, attacked Sehested, screened by a musketeer company of the 1st battalion and the Jaeger company of the 4th. The 6th and 7th battalions of the Russo-German Legion immediately counterattacked, and supported by the 5th battalion, threw the Danes back to their previous position.

Prince Frederik renewed the attack and pushed the allied forces back to the northern part of Sehested. The Russo-Prussian 6th and 7th battalions prepared a new defense, but were soon overrun. By 10 o’clock, Sehested was entirely in Danish hands. The Danes formed a line alongside the southern edge of the town and a detachment under Major Bie, consisting of the 1st battalion of the Funen Infantry Regiment and the Friis battery, were sent to cover the ground between Sehested and Hohenfelde, which the Allied left wing had retreated across. Wallmoden now ordered the Sehested to be retaken and the 5th and 6th battalions of the Legion, along with the Anhalt-Dessau battalion, supported by the guns of the KGL and the Hanoverian battery, returned to the fray, attacking in columns.

Wallmoden's counterattack and retreat
The leading column of the 5th battalion of the Legion was charged by the Funen Dragoon Regiment, but despite the attempt, was unable to form square in time. The survivors were taken prisoner, as were the crews of the two KGL guns and one of the Hanoverian batteries. The other two battalions broke and routed back to safety, whilst the captured artillery pieces were dragged back into the Danish lines. The coalition forces withdrew 500 metres down the Osterrode road, and took up a new position, with their left resting on Hohenfelde, and their right on the Eider. On their left, a fierce engagement developed between the 1st and 2nd battalions of the Russo-German Legion and Bie's force, with the outnumbered Danes getting the worst of it. After realizing his men had run out of ammunition, Bie was forced back about halfway to the Rendborg road, alongside the vanguard. Fortunately for the Danes, the Holstein Cavalry Regiment and the Polish Cavalry Regiment from Haby, arrived and pushed the Allied left back to its main body.

In a desperate attempt to break the Danish line, Wallmoden ordered the Mecklenburg Mounted Jaegers to charge the southern part of Sehested. They were eventually routed by musketfire from the 2nd battalion of the Funen Regiment and the 1st battalion of the Schleswig Regiment. Realising that he could no longer hope to hold his position, Wallmoden ordered a retreat over the Eider to a position on the low heights around Osterrode. Prince Frederik ordered the Holstein Cavalry Regiment forward to try and convert this retreat into a rout, but their attack were beaten off by overwhelming allied musketfire and they fell back to the northern bank of the Eider. From there, they began an artillery bombardment on Wallmoden's position, as well as scouting on Vegesack's division, which had just arrived and was now occupying a position between Wakendorf and Bovenau to the west of the canal. Under heavy bombardment, Wallmoden now began to withdraw across the Cluvensieck bridge, taking up a defensive position facing back across the canal.

End of battle
Charles XIV John had now arrived on the scene, and after a short discussion with Wallmoden and Vegesack, sent a messenger to Prince Frederik suggesting a twenty-four hour ceasefire, in order to collect the wounded and bury the dead, to which Frederik agreed. The Danish troops marched after the vanguard, while a rearguard was kept on the left of the Mühlenerg, to prevent any attempt at pursuit. The battle was over. For the Danes, they had achieved their objective of clearing the road to Rendsburg, whilst the coalition suffered an unhoped defeat. The coalition lost 1,100 men in total, while the Danes lost approximately 500 men.

Consequences
The Dano-Norwegian army reached Rendsburg without further incident, where it established a defensive position along the course of the Eider; with Napoleon beaten and fleeing to France, however, King Frederick IV realized the futility of any further resistance and immediately signed an armistice with the coalition powers in order to start peace negotiations. The negotiations eventually led to the signing, on January 14, 1814, of the Treaty of Kiel, which ended the participation of Denmark-Norway in the Napoleonic Wars.

Orders of Battle

Danish force
Avant Garde Brigade: 
2nd Battalion Schleswig Jaeger Corps
1st & 2nd Battalions Holstein Sharpshooter Corps
1st Battalion 3rd (Jutland) Infantry Regiment
Holstein Heavy Cavalry Regiment (4 squadrons)
17th Polish Lancer Regiment (2 squadrons)
6pdr Foot Battery von Gerstenberg (8 guns)
1st Brigade: General Graf Schulenburg
1st & 4th Battalions Oldenburg Infantry Regiment
3 Companies 2nd Battalion Oldernburg Infantry Regiment
3rd & 4th Battalions Holstein Infantry Regiment
2nd & 6th Squadrons Danish Hussar Regiment
3pdr Foot Battery von Gonner (8 guns)
6pdr Foot Battery Koye (8 guns)
2nd. Brigade General Lasson
1st & 2nd Battalions Funen Infantry Regiment
1st & 2nd Battalions Schleswig Infantry Regiment
Funen Light Dragoon Regiment (3 squadrons)
6pdr Foot Battery Friis (10 guns)
Train Guard
1st Battalion Queen's Infantry Regiment
2 Companies 2nd Battalion Oldenburg Infantry Regiment
Funen Light Dragoon Regiment (1 squadron)

Total: 9,000 men

Allied force

1st Battalion Russo-German Legion (910)
2nd Battalion Russo-German Legion (760)
5th Battalion Russo-German Legion (834)
6th Battalion Russo-German Legion (808)
7th Battalion Russo-German Legion (643)
Hanoverian (German) Lauenburg Battalion (638)
Hanoverian (German) Langrehr Battalion (638)
Hanoverian (German) Bennigsen Battalion (638)
Anhalt-Dessau (German) Battalion (600)
KGL Light (British-German) Detachment (150)
Hanoverian (German) Jaeger Company (40)
Meckleburg (German) Foot Jaegers (375)
1st Russo-German Hussar Regiment (487)
Bremen-Verden (German) Hussar Regiment (300)
Mecklenburg (German) Mounted Jagers (384)
1st Russo-German Horse Battery (6 guns)
2nd Russo-German Horse Battery (6 guns)
Hanoverian (German) Foot Battery (4 guns)
KGL (British-German) Horse Battery-one section (2 guns)
3rd Battalion Russo-German Legion
4th Battalion Russo-German Legion
Hanoverian (German) Feldjagerkorps von Kielmannsegge

Total: 10,500 men

See also 
Treaty of Kiel

Citations

References

External links
 Map of the battle as of 11:00 AM, from napoleon-series.org

Battles of the War of the Sixth Coalition
Battles of the Napoleonic Wars
Battles involving Denmark
Battles involving Prussia
Battles involving Russia
Battles involving Sweden
1813 in Denmark
December 1813 events
Conflicts in 1813
Battles in Schleswig-Holstein